Róbert Orri Þorkelsson was born on April 3, 2002, in Reykjavik, Iceland. He is an Icelandic professional footballer who plays as a defender for CF Montréal.

Club career

CF Montréal
On June 27, 2021, Róbert Orri signed his contract with CF Montréal. He made his professional debut with Montreal in a 0–1 loss against Cruz Azul on March 9, 2022, in the 2022 CONCACAF Champions League.

Career statistics

References

External links
 
 CF Montreal profile

2002 births
Living people
Róbert Þorkelsson
Róbert Þorkelsson
Róbert Þorkelsson
Róbert Þorkelsson
Róbert Þorkelsson
Association football defenders
Afturelding men's football players
Breiðablik UBK players
CF Montréal players
Major League Soccer players
Róbert Þorkelsson